Hogsett is a surname. Notable people with the surname include:

Bob Hogsett (1941–1984), American basketball player
Elon Hogsett (1903–2001), American baseball player
George James Hogsett (1820–1869), Canadian lawyer and politician
Joe Hogsett (born 1956), American politician
Robert Hogsett (c. 1892–1953), American football player
Scott Hogsett (born 1972), American wheelchair rugby player

See also
Hogsett, West Virginia, an unincorporated community